Rai Südtirol ( Rai South Tyrol) is an Italian free-to-air regional television channel owned and operated by state-owned public broadcaster RAI – Radiotelevisione italiana. It is the company's German and Ladin languages television channel aimed at the German-speaking public of South Tyrol and the Ladin-speaking population of Ladinia. It was launched on 7 February 1966, it broadcast from its studios in Bolzano and unlike all other RAI channels, it carries no commercials.

History

Transmissions began on 7 February 1966. Programming initially occupied just one hour daily, broadcast on the local frequencies of Rete 2 (today's Rai 2) between 20.00 and 21.00. On 15 December 1979 Rai Sender Bozen began broadcasting on its own dedicated channel.

Weekly airtime
Unlike all other RAI channels, Rai Südtirol is not on air 24/7. It broadcasts the programmes of Rai Südtirol and Rai Ladinia for different periods of time day by day. Outside its own broadcasting hours, Sender Bozen's frequencies are used by Rai 3.

See also
 Tagesschau, the daily newscast.

External links
 RAI Südtirol Official website (in German)

RAI television channels
German-language television stations
Television channels and stations established in 1966
1966 establishments in Italy
Commercial-free television networks
German-language mass media in South Tyrol
Mass media in Bolzano
Television in minority languages